Kristina Wagenbauer is a Canadian film director and screenwriter based in Montreal, Quebec. She is most noted for her 2017 feature film Sashinka, for which she was a Prix Iris nominee for Best Casting at the 21st Quebec Cinema Awards in 2019, and her 2021 short film Babushka, which was a Canadian Screen Award nominee for Best Short Documentary at the 10th Canadian Screen Awards in 2022.

References

External links

21st-century Canadian screenwriters
21st-century Canadian women writers
Canadian documentary film directors
Canadian women film directors
Canadian women screenwriters
Canadian screenwriters in French
Canadian people of Russian descent
Film directors from Montreal
Writers from Montreal
Living people
Year of birth missing (living people)
Canadian women documentary filmmakers